The Busy Little Engine is a 2005 children's DVD written and directed by Desmond Mullen. It was selected for the 2006 San Diego International Children's Film Festival and reviewed in the professional library journals Booklist, School Library Journal, and Video Librarian. The Busy Little Engine was picked Best DVD by Parenting Magazine in July 2006.

Plot
The preschool-age DVD tells the story of a wooden toy train who pretends to be a real train. The main character, Busy Little Engine, appears alternately as a wooden toy train in a playroom and as a full-scale-size train in real-world backgrounds. With its intentionally gentle pacing and static camera work, it has been called "a young child's picture book come-to-life".

Busy Little Engine pretends to be a real train but does not actually know what real trains do. This presents a problem which is soon solved with the help of Busy Little Engine's puppet friend, Pig, and the off-screen narrator.

Through the course of the show, Busy Little Engine and Pig explore the everyday world using role-playing and imagination. Viewers learn about tangible topics such as raw goods, finished materials and basic railroad operations along with esoteric topics such as pretending, taking turns, and learning from others.

Cast
 Desmond Mullen as Busy Little Engine and the Narrator
 Lorrie Guess as the Prologue

Reception
The Busy Little Engine was selected for the 2006 San Diego International Children's Film Festival. It was picked Best DVD by Parenting Magazine in July 2006.

Inspired, in part, by Richard Scarry's book, What do People do All Day? and other children's picture books, the DVD uses static framing to its advantage. DVD Verdict's review said:

Yet the three kids I've shown it to have been rooted to the screen. Creator Desmond Mullen, formerly of Industrial Light and Magic and a current producer for the Morehead Planetarium, makes an interesting observation: Pans, cuts, and other cinematic shorthand are not natural. We have to learn what they mean. Kids don't intuitively understand that a jump cut means something. Pig's straightforward manner and The Busy Little Engine's static framing mimic the way a child interprets the world. The proof is self evident: Kids dig this DVD.

References

External links 
 
 

2005 direct-to-video films
2005 films
American direct-to-video films
2000s children's films
American children's films
2000s English-language films
2000s American films